Ng Pak Kum (born 8 October 1968) is a Hong Kong former badminton player. He competed in the men's doubles tournament at the 1992 Summer Olympics.

References

External links
 

1968 births
Living people
Hong Kong male badminton players
Olympic badminton players of Hong Kong
Badminton players at the 1992 Summer Olympics
Place of birth missing (living people)
Commonwealth Games medallists in badminton
Commonwealth Games bronze medallists for Hong Kong
Badminton players at the 1990 Commonwealth Games
20th-century Hong Kong people
Medallists at the 1990 Commonwealth Games